The 2022 Rally Estonia was a motor racing event for rally cars held over four days between 14 and 17 July 2022. It marked the twelfth running of the Rally Estonia. The event was the seventh round of the 2022 World Rally Championship, World Rally Championship-2 and World Rally Championship-3.

Kalle Rovanperä and Jonne Halttunen were the defending rally winners. Their team, Toyota Gazoo Racing WRT, were the defending manufacturers' winners. Andreas Mikkelsen and Ola Fløene were the defending rally winners in the WRC-2 category. Aleksey Lukyanuk and Yaroslav Fedorov were the defending rally winners in the WRC-3 category. In the junior category, Sami Pajari and Marko Salminen were the defending winners.

Rovanperä and Halttunen successfully defended their titles, so as their team, Toyota Gazoo Racing WRT. Mikkelsen and Torstein Eriksen won the World Rally Championship-2 category. Pajari and Enni Mälkönen won the World Rally Championship-3 category as well as the junior class.

Background

Entry list
The following crews entered into the rally. The event was opened to crews competing in the World Rally Championship, its support categories, the World Rally Championship-2 and World Rally Championship-3, and privateer entries that were not registered to score points in any championship. Eleven were entered under Rally1 regulations, as were nineteen Rally2 crews in the World Rally Championship-2 and seven Rally3 crews in the World Rally Championship-3.

Itinerary
All dates and times are EEST (UTC+3).

Report

WRC Rally1

Classification

Special stages

Championship standings

WRC-2 Rally2

Classification

Special stages

Championship standings

WRC-3 Rally3

Classification

Special stages

Championship standings

Notes

References

External links
  
 2022 Rally Estonia at eWRC-results.com
 2022 Rally Estonia at rally-maps.com 

2022 in Estonian sport
Estonia
July 2022 sports events in Europe
2022